The British Safety Industry Federation (BSIF) is the Trade Association for the safety industry and acts as a leading voice for the sector. Set up in 1994 the Federation has some 400 members representing the complete supply chain including manufacturers, importers and distributors of personal protective equipment (PPE) and safety products, through to test houses, certification bodies and specialist safety service providers.

BSIF work closely with the Health and Safety Executive (HSE) and Trading Standards with whom we have a Primary Authority partnership. BSIF are the UK’s leading association for the Personal Protective Equipment (PPE) Regulation 2016/425 and provide guidance for PPE compliance, working closely with Regulators, we are active across a range of Government departments. Our close relationship and influence with the Department for Business, Energy and Industrial Strategy (BEIS) and the Office for Product Safety and Standards (OPSS) continues to develop our access to the appropriate agencies which allows us to be at the forefront on legislation and policy in the post-Brexit era.

We actively support our member organisations through a variety of means and have their collective interests at the heart of what we do. Whether we are promoting industry guidance or bringing together stakeholders, the BSIF’s mantra is always ‘to support all those keeping people safe and healthy at work” whilst re-affirming the message that Health & Safety is a positive force for good’.

Through the Registered Safety Supplier Scheme (RSSS), BSIF is helping to improve standards in the UK market by ensuring our members adhere to relevant regulation. The scheme seeks to improve the quality of product and the capability of suppliers, keeping users and buyers up to date, while promoting the merits of using RSSS members to source PPE and safety products.

Reference and external links
BSIF Website

References 

Trade associations based in the United Kingdom